DeKalb County High School (DCHS) is located in Smithville, Tennessee. It is the only high school in the county and serves grades 9–12 with an enrollment of 890 as of August 12, 2021. The school's mascot is a tiger and the school colors are black and gold. The principal is Grant Curtis and the assistant principals are Thomas Cagle and Jenny Norris. The school is fed by DeKalb Middle School (6-8; located at the same complex as the high school) and DeKalb West School (K-8).

Clubs
DCHS has a variety of clubs, including FFA, FBLA, FCCLA, HOSA, Jr. and Sr. Beta Club, SkillsUSA, CTE, a Chess Club, a Literature Club, a Science Club, and a Spanish Club. Other groups include the Student Council as well as a Color Guard and Marching Band known as the "Fighting Tiger Marching Band".

References

Public high schools in Tennessee
Schools in DeKalb County, Tennessee
1963 establishments in Tennessee